Mac Brennan (born July 15, 1990) is an American software engineer and former professional racing cyclist. In 2014, Brennan finished fifth at the Bucks County Classic, 57 seconds behind winner Zachary Bell. He rode in the men's team time trial at the 2015 UCI Road World Championships.

References

External links
Github.io page

1990 births
Living people
American male cyclists
American software engineers
Michigan Technological University alumni
Place of birth missing (living people)
20th-century American people
21st-century American people